Buccal may refer to:
 Buccal, or buccal cavity, an oral body cavity (mouth), particularly the cheek cavity
 Buccal administration
 Buccal space, in the mouth
 Buccal artery
 Buccal branch of the facial nerve
 Buccal nerve